The F/V Big Valley was a 92-foot (28 m) crabber boat. Only one member of the crew survived: Cache Seel, 30. Skipper Gary Edwards, 46, of Kodiak, Alaska; Danny Vermeersch, 33 of Belgium; Josias Luna, 48, of Anchorage, Alaska; Aaron Marrs, 27, of Louisville, Kentucky; and Carlos Rivera, 35, of Uruguay all perished.

The vessel's Emergency position-indicating radiobeacon station (EPIRB) went off around 8:00am AST (UTC−9), at the beginning of the 2005 opilio crab hunting season. Three fishing vessels (F/V Cornelia Marie, F/V Maverick and Sea Rover), U.S. Coast Guard ship USCGC Sherman, the Alaska state patrol boat Stimson, and a Coast Guard helicopter out of Saint Paul Island were involved in the search.

The helicopter rescued Cache Seel, who was the only crewmember to make it to the life raft. Vermeersch and Rivera, who were wearing survival suits like Seel, were found deceased in the water. Vermeersch was recovered by the helicopter, and Rivera was recovered by Stimson. Edwards, Luna and Marrs fell into the water without survival suits, and their bodies were never found. According to Seel's account, Edwards and Luna were thrown overboard while trying to release the life raft. Vermeersch ultimately freed it, but only Seel made it to the raft after 50 minutes in the water.

The Coast Guard had limited the F/V Big Valley, one of the smallest boats that participated in the crab fishery, to carrying 31 crab pots. She left Dutch Harbor in Unalaska, Alaska, for her final trip with 55 pots and 13,000 pounds of bait, more than three times the amount allowed, according to the Coast Guard investigation. That extra weight contributed to her fate, the investigation found.

The search for F/V Big Valley was covered in an episode of the television show, Deadliest Catch. It was F/V Big Valley's captain, Gary Edwards, who demonstrated the EPIRB for the show. The boat was also part of the pilot episode of Deadliest Catch in 2004. There were no known cameras or production crew on board the boat when it sank in 2005.

Survivor
Seel, who was taken to Kodiak, Alaska, and ultimately recovered, gave authorities his account of the event, clearing up details of the night. He reported that there was no icing occurring on the deck and the boat was carrying 50 pots for crab fishing.

References

2005 in Alaska
Fishing ships of the United States
Maritime incidents in 2005
Shipwrecks of the Alaska coast
Ships built in Mobile, Alabama